The Daddy Day Care film series consists of American family-comedy films. Based on original characters by Geoff Rodkey, the plot centers around unemployed dads who start a day care services to help bring in more funds for their respective families. Comedic circumstances follow, as the men are overwhelmed by the rambunctious and mischievous actions of the children.

The first film, though a financial success at the box-office, received generally negative reviews from critics. Variety called it "scarcely more amusing than spending ninety minutes in a pre K classroom". Part two proved to be a moderate success financially, though it was panned by film critics with critiques pointed at the overuse of potty humor. The final film in the trilogy, which debuted over a decade after its predecessor, was made with a small-budget and was released straight-to-home video. The film was met with negative reviews, though it fared well with rentals and sales.

Films

Daddy Day Care (2003)

Charles "Charlie" Hinton is unemployed and a stay-at-home father, taking care of his young son, while his wife makes a living and pays for the bills. Charlie works with his friend named Phillip "Phil" Ryerson, who is also without a job, to establish Daddy Day Care. The pair quickly gain a popular reputation, causing an enrollment swell. With additional regulations, they struggle to keep business alive. When a competing day care owner named Ms. Gwyneth Harridan calls the attention social workers in attempt to put Daddy Day Care out of business, social services notifies the business that their operating home is not large enough for their number of clients, causing Charlie and Phil to hold a fundraiser to raise funding.

Events that follow lead Charlie to quit the company, and focus on his family instead. As parents flock to Ms. Harridan's Day Care, Charlie and Phil realize their role in children's lives. At a student orientation, the pair reveal her careless ways and expose her distaste for her work. Expressing their love for the children that they have cared for, adults sign on for business with Daddy Day Care, earning the company enough money for the new office.

Daddy Day Camp (2007)

Charlie Hinton and Phil Ryerson, close friends who formed a successful day care center partnership, purchase a camp site from their past. After being instigated by their wives to do so, Camp Driftwood becomes a business venture between the pair. An offshoot of their Daddy Day Care business, Charlie and Phil face insurmountable odds when renovating the site, while also competing with a nearby rival location. Camp Canola, ran by Charlie's rival named Lance, is a luxurious, successful, and thriving campsite, while Camp Driftwood requires a lot of work to restore the grounds to its former glory.

After various attempts, the duo find that they may face a bankruptcy process. Along with the plans for the upcoming Olympiad challenge event between the rival camps, Charlie and Phil become overwhelmed. Charlie approaches his estranged father, for help in returning the camp to its prestigious past reputation. Buck Hinton, a military veteran, seeks to help the pair, but is critical of his son and Phil. After various differences he leaves the camp, only a difficult reconciliation between father and son, so that Charlie won't disappoint the children and bring Buck back to the campgrounds. With the help of Buck, Camp Driftwood reveals that the competing team was cheating all along, and that they have for years. Camp Canola's trophies are destroyed, while every parent from that camp request to sign up for Camp Driftwood. Saving the pair from a foreclosure, the partnership looks forward to coming seasons with the sign-ons.

Grand-Daddy Day Care (2019)

Frank Collins is a best-selling author, who suffers from writer's block. While attempting to crack the story for his next novel he and his wife, Emma, struggle to pay their bills and make ends meet. Her hard-headed/former-convict and retired lawyer father, Eduardo, comes to stay with them. Finding it more difficult to entertain his father-in-law and attempt to write his next novel, Frank decides to invite over Eduardo's friends to keep him preoccupied. Their home filled with elderly seniors, falls into mischief. The Collins couple realize that they could be making money by hosting and monitoring these elderly individuals. Upon learning of the business being run from the house, a persistent social worker named Ned Tooley becomes determined to shut them down.

Eduardo uses his former law skills, to plan a course of action for Frank and Emma to stay in business. Together they purchase the established, but on hiatus, Daddy Day Care from Charles "Charlie" Hinton. Charles recounts his attempts at success with the business, cautioning them in the unfortunate life-events that may follow. After purchasing the company, they attempt to register and rebrand the establishment as "Granddaddy Day Care". Upon doing so, they learn that there is a waiting period. After being fined by the city, due to the social worker's analysis, the Collins couple struggle to earn enough money to pay their debtors and the fines. Eduardo, who has shown the early stages of dementia, decides to help them sue the city. In court they present their case that they were not issued any warnings, nor Mr. Tooley's observations of the things they must change to meet city code. The judge adjourns in favor of Granddaddy Day Care, and the company continues to grow and flourish. Frank, Emma, their son, and Eduardo grow closer as a family over and realize how blessed their lives are. Frank meanwhile, has a new idea for a book. After writing and publishing the story, based on his new elderly friends, the tome once again becomes a best-seller.

Main cast and characters

Additional crew and production details

Reception

Box office and financial performance

Critical and public response

References 

American film series
Comedy film series
Children's film series
Film series introduced in 2003
Films about families
American children's comedy films
Films about children
Columbia Pictures franchises
TriStar Pictures franchises
Revolution Studios films
Universal Pictures franchises